The Laysan Island class were three salvage craft tenders serving with the United States Navy during World War II. They were converted from landing ship tanks in response to a Commander Service Forces, Pacific Fleet request that for tenders to support salvage vessels during amphibious operations which would carry pumps, air compressors, repair materials and firefighting equipment. They were also to include extra divers on board and repair facilities for the salvage ships. The ships of the class were built as LSTs and modified to tenders during construction at the Jeffersonville Boat and Machine Company.

Ships in class

References 

Auxiliary ship classes of the United States Navy